Negash Wagesho is an Ethiopian politician who has been serving as Deputy Chief Administrator of South West Ethiopia Peoples' Region since December, 2021. Before his assignment as Deputy Chief Administrator, he has served as State Minister for Ministry of Water, Irrigation and Electricity of Ethiopia.

References

21st-century Ethiopian politicians
Living people
Year of birth missing (living people)
People from South West Ethiopia Peoples' Region
Water ministers of Ethiopia